The Polynesian island of Huahine, in the Society Islands, was a kingdom ruled by the Teurura'i dynasty from the 18th century until its annexation by France in 1895. The island is now a part of French Polynesia.

Monarchs of Huahine

Family tree

See also
 List of monarchs of Tahiti
 List of monarchs of Raiatea
 List of monarchs of Bora Bora
 List of colonial and departmental heads of French Polynesia
 President of French Polynesia

References

Huahine
Huahine
 
Huahine monarchs
Huahine